Augustina Nwaokolo (born December 12, 1992) is a Nigerian weightlifter. She competed in the women's 48 kg event at the 2014 Commonwealth Games where she won a gold medal.
Augustina Nwaokolo won the first gold medal of the games which see her setting a new Games record of 175 kg after lifting 77 kg in the snatch and 98 kg in the clean and jerk. This saw her became the first Nigerian teenage weightlifter to achieve that in an International competitions and the Commonwealth Games. The event took place at the Jawaharlal Nehru Stadium.

Competition participated 
 2010 Commonwealth Games
Weightlifting - 48kg - Women
Gold
175.0 (GR)

 2014 Commonwealth Games
Weightlifting - --8kg - Women

 2018 Commonwealth Games
Weightlifting - --kg - Women

References

External links 

1992 births
Living people
Nigerian female weightlifters
Commonwealth Games gold medallists for Nigeria
Weightlifters at the 2014 Commonwealth Games
Commonwealth Games medallists in weightlifting
Weightlifters at the 2010 Commonwealth Games
Sportspeople from Lagos
20th-century Nigerian women
21st-century Nigerian women
Medallists at the 2010 Commonwealth Games